Pentland may refer to:

Places 
In Scotland:
Pentland Firth, a strait between Orkney and Caithness in the far north 
Pentland Skerries, a group of islands lying in the Pentland Firth
Pentland Hills, a range just south of Edinburgh in the south east
 Pentland Rising, or Battle of Rullion Green, a key conflict in the development of Scottish Presbyterianism
Edinburgh Pentlands (disambiguation), the name of two parliamentary constituencies

Elsewhere:
Pentland, Queensland, Australia
 Pentland Corners, Ontario, Canada, a community in Centre Wellington
Pentland, California, United States
Pentland Township, Michigan, United States

People with the surname 
Joseph Barclay Pentland (1797–1873), Irish geographer
Baron Pentland, extinct hereditary peerage in the UK
John Sinclair, 1st Baron Pentland (1860–1925), Scottish politician
Henry John Sinclair, 2nd Baron Pentland (1907–1984)
Alexander Pentland (1884–1983), Australian World War I flying ace
Alex Pentland (born 1951), MIT Professor and entrepreneur
Barbara Pentland (1912–2000), Canadian composer
Fred Pentland (1883–1962), English footballer and manager
Norman Pentland (1912–1972), British Labour Member of Parliament for Chester-le-Street
Patrick Pentland (born 1969), Irish musician and member of the Canadian rock band, Sloan
Robert Pentland, American politician

People with the given name 
Pentland Hick (born 1919), British entrepreneur and author

Other uses 
Pentland (crater), on the moon
Pentland Ferries which operates in the Pentland Firth
 Pentland Group plc, a privately held, global brand management company based in the UK
 Lord Pentland (judicial title) (born 1957), Senator of the College of Justice (Scotland)